Kyle Troup (born June 11, 1991) is an American professional ten-pin bowler residing in Taylorsville, North Carolina. He uses the two-handed shovel-style delivery with a dominant right hand. Troup says he needed two hands when learning to throw the ball as a young child, calling himself self-taught in that regard.

Troup has been a member of the Professional Bowlers Association (PBA) since 2008, and began competing full-time on the PBA Tour in 2015. He won his first national PBA Tour title at the 2015 PBA Wolf Open and has nine PBA Tour titles to date, including one major championship and two wins in the PBA Playoffs. Since 2018, Troup also competes internationally as a member of Team USA.

With his $100,000 win at the PBA Playoffs on May 16, 2021, Troup set the PBA's single-season earnings record with $469,200, surpassing the $419,700 earned by Walter Ray Williams Jr. in the 2002–03 season. Troup would finish the 2021 season with $496,900 in earnings. At the PBA Tour Finals on June 5, 2022, Troup bowled the 33rd televised 300 game in PBA Tour history.

Troup is a member of the Storm and Vise Grips pro staffs.

Amateur career

As a teenager, Troup was one of the youngest-ever members of the North Carolina All Stars team, bowling in events across South Carolina and Georgia in addition to his home state.

On January 7, 2018, Troup finished as the top qualifier at the United States Bowling Congress Team USA Trials, making the team for the first time in his career. At the 2018 World Bowling Tour Men's Championships in Hong Kong (held November 24–December 5), he won a gold medal in trios with teammates Andrew Anderson and E. J. Tackett.

Troup and his Team USA teammates won the 2019 Weber Cup over Team Europe. Troup bowled in ten matches over the 32-match event, going 5–0 in singles, 0–3 in doubles, and 1–1 in team. In the 2020 Weber Cup, Troup and Team USA again defeated Team Europe, 23–18. Overall in the 2020 event, Troup participated in 14 of 41 matches, going 3–3 in singles, 2–4 in doubles, and 1–1 in team. At the 2021 Weber Cup, the USA was defeated by Team Europe, 18–17. Troup participated in 10 of 35 matches, going 0–4 in singles, 2–0 in doubles, and 0–3 in team.

PBA career
Said to be one of the PBA's premier two-handed bowlers, Troup sometimes uses an older-technology urethane bowling ball on shorter oil patterns. Troup has made 27 PBA championship round appearances through the 2021 season, and owns ten PBA Regional titles. He has rolled 16 career 300 games in PBA competition through July 2020.

Early career
Troup spent his first five years as a PBA member bowling mostly in PBA Regional Tour events close to home, while he worked his regular job managing a Wendy's restaurant. He won his first Regional title at age 19 in the 2010 Fort Jackson (SC) Non-Champion Regional. He was named PBA Southern Region Player of the Year in both 2013 and 2014.

2015
In 2015, Troup decided to bowl more events on the national PBA Tour, and made it to the championship round (the final stage of a PBA tournament) four times. He won the 2015 PBA Wolf Open in Shawnee, Oklahoma for his first PBA Tour title. He finished eighth in the South Shore PBA/PBA50 doubles with PBA50 player Jerry Brunette Jr.

2016

In 2016, Troup finished second in the Downums Waste Services Xtra Frame Open, and fourth in the Gene Carter's Pro Shop Classic.

2017
Troup's second PBA Tour title came on April 16, 2017 in the Mark Roth-Marshall Holman PBA Doubles Championship, where he teamed with left-handed two-hander Jesper Svensson for the title. His only other TV finals appearance in 2017 was at the PBA World Championship major, where he finished fourth.

2018
On January 28, 2018, Troup made it to the final match of the DHC PBA Japan Invitational, but finished runner-up to top seed Dominic Barrett. Troup won his third PBA title on September 9, 2018 at the Storm Lucky Larsen Masters in Malmö, Sweden, defeating reigning PBA Player of the Year Jason Belmonte in the final match.

2019
Kyle was a member of the Portland Lumberjacks team, winners of the 2019 PBA League competition. He made a career-high five championship round appearances in 2019, but did not win an individual title.

2020
Troup won his fourth PBA Tour title at the 2020 PBA Jonesboro Open on February 1. As the #1 seed for the stepladder finals, he defeated Chris Barnes in his sole championship match appearance, 290–269. Troup won his fifth PBA Tour title at the 2020 Mark Roth-Marshall Holman PBA Doubles Championship on February 29. As the #1 seeds for the final round, Troup and partner Jesper Svensson defeated E. J. Tackett and Marshall Kent, 234–205. This was the second Roth-Holman doubles title for the Troup-Svensson duo, who also won this event in 2017. On July 19, Troup claimed his sixth PBA Tour title at the 2020 PBA Tour Finals held in Jupiter, Florida. After topping Kris Prather in the semifinals, Troup defeated Anthony Simonsen in the championship round. In both rounds, Troup lost the first game of the double-elimination match, then rallied back to win the second game and the 9th/10th frame roll-off. Troup also rolled a 299 game in the televised seeding round of this competition, leaving a 2-pin standing on his twelfth and final shot after eleven strikes. Despite the COVID-shortened 2020 season, Troup cashed a career-high $135,300.

2021: first major, season earnings record and Player of the Year
Troup won the East Region finals for the 2021 PBA Players Championship, qualifying him for the championship stepladder. He then went on to capture the title and record-tying $250,000 top prize on February 21, winning from the #1 seed position over #3 seed Dick Allen. This was Troup's seventh PBA title and first major championship. Based on points earned during the first nine events of the 2021 season, Troup earned the #1 seed for the PBA Tour Playoffs, which ran April 24 to May 16. He made it to the final round and defeated Sam Cooley, three games to one, to earn his second title of the season, eighth title overall, and the $100,000 winner's share. The earnings pushed Troup to $469,200 on the season, surpassing the previous PBA single-season earnings record of $419,700 set by Walter Ray Williams Jr. in 2002–03. Troup's total 2021 earnings were $496,900. Troup also set personal bests in 2021 with 13 match play rounds, nine top-ten finishes, and eight championship round appearances.

In a landslide vote, Troup won the Chris Schenkel PBA Player of the Year award for the 2021 season. While topping the Tour in earnings, Troup also collected 19,922.5 points to easily win the Harry Smith PBA Points Leader award.

2022: PBA Playoffs repeat and Best Bowler ESPY
In early 2022, Troup was voted to receive the Dick Weber Bowling Ambassador Award, which has been given annually since 2006 by the Bowling Proprietors Association of America (BPAA) to "the bowling athlete who has consistently shown grace on and off the lanes by promoting the sport of bowling in a positive manner."

Despite not winning a title through the first thirteen events of the 2022 season, Troup accumulated enough points to earn the #9 seed for the PBA Playoffs. After defeating Sean Rash in the Round of 16, he defeated former Playoffs champions Bill O'Neill (quarterfinals) and Kris Prather (semifinals) to once again make it to the final round. In the "race to three points" finals, he defeated Tommy Jones, three games to one, to earn his first title of the season and ninth title overall, while also becoming the first player to win back-to-back Playoffs championships. The win also pushed Troup over the $1,000,000 mark in career PBA earnings. He bowled the 33rd televised 300 game in PBA Tour history at the PBA Tour Finals on June 5, 2022.

On July 10, Troup's PBA League team, the Portland Lumberjacks, won the Elias Cup, after which Troup was named League MVP. Troup later outlasted 11 other players to win the PBA Strike Derby, a non-title special event held in conjunction with the PBA League competition.

On July 20, Troup won the ESPY Award for Best Bowler.

PBA Tour titles
Major championships are in bold type.

 2015 PBA Wolf Open (Shawnee, Oklahoma)
 2017 Mark Roth-Marshall Holman PBA Doubles Championship w/Jesper Svensson (Portland, Maine)
 2018 Storm Lucky Larsen Masters (Malmö, Sweden)
 2020 PBA Jonesboro Open (Jonesboro, Arkansas)
 2020 Mark Roth-Marshall Holman PBA Doubles Championship w/Jesper Svensson (Indianapolis, Indiana)
 2020 PBA Tour Finals (Jupiter, Florida)
 2021 PBA Players Championship (Jupiter, Florida)
 2021 Kia PBA Playoffs (Milford, Connecticut)
 2022 Kia PBA Playoffs (Jupiter, Florida)

Non-title PBA wins
 2022 PBA Strike Derby

Awards and records
 PBA Southern Region Player of the Year (2013)
 PBA Southern Region Player of the Year (2014)
 Chris Schenkel PBA Player of the Year (2021)
 Harry Smith PBA Points Leader (2021)
 Highest earnings in a single PBA Tour season ($496,900 in 2021)
 BPAA Dick Weber Bowling Ambassador Award (2022)
 PBA League Most Valuable Player (2022)
 Best Bowler ESPY Award (2022)

Personal
Kyle is the son of eight-time PBA Tour winner Guppy Troup, the two constituting the fourth father-son pair to each win PBA Tour titles (following Dick and Pete Weber, Don and Jimmy Johnson, and Don and Eugene McCune).

Troup has become one of the more recognized players on tour due to his throwback Afro hairdo, Partridge Family bus-styled attire, and other unique choices of trousers, similar to his father who was known for his flamboyant public persona. Kyle's nicknames on Tour are "Afro Fish", "The Pro with the Fro", and the "Bob Ross of Bowling".

After being knocked out of the 2019 PBA Tour Playoffs in the second round, Troup provided analysis for the final four and championship finals live broadcasts (aired June 1 and 2 on Fox), along with Jason Belmonte and the regular PBA broadcast team of Rob Stone and Randy Pedersen.

PBA career statistics
Statistics are through July 2022.

+CRA = Championship Round Appearances

References

External links
 Troup's profile page at PBA.com

Living people
1991 births
American ten-pin bowling players
People from Taylorsville, North Carolina
Place of birth missing (living people)